The Fur language (or For; Fur: bèle fòòr or fòòraŋ bèle; , Fûrâwî; sometimes called Konjara by linguists, after a former ruling clan) is a Nilo-Saharan language spoken by the Fur of Darfur in Western Sudan. It is part of a broader family of languages known as the Fur languages.

Phonology

The consonantal phonemes are:

All sounds are spelt with their IPA symbols except for the following: j = , ñ =  and y = . Arabic consonants are sometimes used in loanwords.

The vowels are as in Latin: a e i o u. There is dispute as to whether the –ATR vowels  are phonetic variants or separate phonemes.

There are two underlying tonemes, L (low) and H (high); phonetically, L, H, mid, HL, and LH are all found.

Metathesis is an extremely common and regular grammatical phenomenon in Fur: when a consonant pronoun prefix is prefixed to a verb that begins with a consonant, either the verb's first consonant is deleted or it changes places with the following vowel; e.g.: lem- "lick" → -elm-; ba- "drink" → -ab-; tuum- "build" → -utum-. There are also various assimilation rules.

Morphology

Plurals

Noun, and optionally adjective, plurals can be formed with -a (-ŋa after vowels): aldí "story" → aldíŋá "stories", tóŋ "(a certain species of) antelope" → pira "antelopes"; piraŋa "old" → tooy'báiná "old (pl.)". This suffix also gives the inanimate 3rd person plural of the verb: liíŋ "he bathes" → liíŋá "they (inanimate) bathe", káliŋa "they (animate) bathe".

Vowel-final adjectives can take a plural in -lá, as well as -ŋa: lúllá "cold" → lúllála or lúlláŋa "cold (pl.)". A similar suffix (metathesized and assimilated to become -ól/-úl/-ál) is used for the plural of the verb in some tenses.

A few CVV nouns take the plural suffix H-ta; roo "river" → roota'wala gal rooŋa "rivers"; ra̱yi' wala gal ra̱y "field" → rǎ̱ytó'wala gal rǎ̱ytá "fields".

At least two nouns take the suffix -i: kóór "spear" → kóórí "spears", dʉ́tʉ "mouse" → kʉ́ʉ́tɨ́ "mice".

Nouns with the singular prefix d- (> n- before a nasal) take the plural k-; these are about 20% of all nouns. In some cases (mostly body parts) it is accompanied by L; e.g.: dɨ́ló "ear" → kɨ́ló "ears"; nʉ́ŋɨ́ "eye" → kʉ́ŋɨ́ "eyes"; dági "tooth" → kagi "teeth"; dormí "nose" → kormi "noses".
In some cases the singular also has a suffix -ŋ, not found in the plural: daulaŋ "shoe" → kaula "shoes", dɨróŋ "egg" → kɨro "eggs".
Sometimes a further plural suffix from those listed above is added: nʉ́nʉm "granary" → kʉ́nʉ́ma "granaries", nʉ́ʉ́m "snake" → kʉ́ʉ́mɨ́ "snakes", dɨwwô "new" → kɨwwóla'wala gal 'kɨwwóŋa "new (pl.)"
Sometimes the suffix -(n)ta, is added: dewer "porcupine" → kewértá "porcupines"; da̱wi "tail" → ka̱wíntó'wala gal ka̱wíntá "tails".
One noun, as well as the demonstratives and the interrogative "which", take a plural by simply prefixing k-L: úú "cow" → kuu "cows"; á̱yɨ "which (one)?" → ká̱yɨ "which (ones)?".
Several syntactic plurals with no singulars, mostly denoting liquids, have k-L-a; kewa "blood", koro "water", kona "name, song" koonà.

Nouns

The locative case can be expressed by the suffix -le or by reversing the noun's final tone, e.g.: tòŋ "house" → toŋ "at the house"; loo "place", kàrrà "far" → loo kàrrà-le "at a far place".

The genitive (English possessive s) is expressed by the suffix -iŋ (the i is deleted after a vowel.) If the relationship is possessive, the possessor comes first; otherwise, it comes last; e.g.: nuum "snake" → nuumiŋ tàbù "snake's head"; jùtà "forest" → kàrabà jùtăŋ "animals of the forest".

Pronouns

Independent subject:

The object pronouns are identical apart from being low tone and having -ŋó added to the plural forms.

Prefixed subject pronouns:

Thus, for example, on the verb bʉo- "tire":

gi, described as the "participant object pronoun", represents first or second person objects in a dialogue, depending on context.

Possessives (singular; take k- with plural nouns):

Verbs

The Fur verbal system is quite complicated; verbs fall into a variety of conjugations. There are three tenses: present, perfect, and future. Subjunctive is also marked. Aspect is distinguished in the past tense.

Derivational suffixes include -iŋ (intransitive/reflexive; e.g. lii "he washes" → liiŋ "he washes himself) and gemination of the middle consonant plus -à/ò (intensive; e.g. jabi "drop" → jappiò/jabbiò "throw down".)

Negation is done with the marker a-...-bà surrounding the verb; a-bai-bà "he does not drink".

Adjectives

Most adjectives have two syllables, and a geminate middle consonant: e.g. àppa "big", fùkka "red", lecka "sweet". Some have three syllables: dàkkure "solid".

Adverbs can be derived from adjectives by addition of the suffix -ndì or L-n, e.g.: kùlle "fast" → kùllendì or kùllèn "quickly".

Abstract nouns can be derived from adjectives by adding -iŋ and lowering all tones, deleting any final vowel of the adjective, e.g.: dìrro "heavy" → dìrrìŋ "heaviness".

Media in Fur language
Radio Dabanga - broadcasts daily news in the Fur language and in other languages local to Darfur.

References

Sources
 Beaton, A.C. A Grammar of the Fur Language. Linguistic Monograph Series, No. 1. Khartoum: Sudan Research Unit, Faculty of Arts, University of Khartoum 1968 (1937).
 Jakobi, Angelika. A Fur Grammar. Buske Verlag: Hamburg 1989.
 Kutsch-Lojenga, Constance and Christine Waag, "The Sounds and Tones of Fur", in Occasional Papers in the Study of Sudanese Languages No. 9. Entebbe: SIL-Sudan 2004.
 Noel, Georgianna. An Examination of the Tone System of Fur and its Function in Grammar, University of Texas at Arlington, 2008.

Fur languages
Bariwarig Tooduo, "Participant Reference". University of Juba 2014